Marak (also Romanized as Marāk) is a village in Kahshang Rural District of the Central District of Birjand County, South Khorasan province, Iran. At the 2006 National Census, its population was 532 in 136 households. The following census in 2011 counted 568 people in 155 households. The latest census in 2016 showed a population of 569 people in 151 households; it was the largest village in its rural district.

References 

Birjand County

Populated places in South Khorasan Province

Populated places in Birjand County